Glasgow, the largest city in Scotland, has several distinct styles of residential buildings, and since its population began to grow rapidly the 18th century has been at the forefront of some large-scale projects to deal with its housing issues, some of which have been assessed as being largely successful and others less so.

Overview
The city is known for its tenements, where a common stairwell is informally known as a close. These were the most popular form of housing in 19th- and 20th-century Glasgow and remain the most common form of dwelling in Glasgow today. Tenements are commonly bought by a wide range of social types and are favoured for their large rooms, high ceilings and original period features. The Hyndland area of Glasgow is the only tenement conservation area in the UK and includes some tenement houses with as many as six bedrooms.

Like many cities in the UK, Glasgow witnessed the construction of high-rise housing in tower blocks in the 1960s. These were built to replace the decaying tenement buildings originally constructed in the 1800s for workers who migrated from the surrounding countryside, the Scottish Highlands, the rest of the United Kingdom, particularly Ireland, and further afield (Italy, Lithuania, Poland) to smaller degrees, to feed the local demand for labour during the Industrial Revolution which saw the city's population and importance increase rapidly to the extent that it became the 'second city of the Empire'. The massive demand outstripped new building and many, originally fine, tenements often became overcrowded and unsanitary. Parts of inner city areas like Anderston, Cowcaddens, the Garngad, Townhead and particularly the Gorbals, as well as parts of the industrialised East End (Bridgeton, the Calton, Camlachie, the Gallowgate) deteriorated into slums in which disease thrived. Efforts to improve this housing situation, most successfully with the City Improvement Trust, cleared the slums of the old town. Between the two World Wars, the area of Glasgow doubled in size.

Subsequent urban renewal initiatives following World War II, such as those motivated by the Bruce Report, and the Abercrombie Plan, entailed the demolition of slum tenement areas, the development of new towns, the building of overspill estates on the periphery of the city, and the construction of tower blocks. Several districts of the city were designated 'Comprehensive Development Areas' with the intention to raze them and rebuild from scratch with entire communities dispersed. Although the new town option was accepted, with places such as East Kilbride and Cumbernauld being established, the need for thousands of new homes was becoming ever more pressing – almost half of the dwellings in the city had been judged as overcrowded in the 1951 census while in 1957, 97% of housing in the Gorbals was still described as 'unsatisfactory sanitorially' – and with the Glasgow Corporation keen for as many citizens to remain as taxpayers within their boundaries as possible despite limited space and funds available, the overspill and tower proposals were eagerly pursued, in contrast with the trend of lower-density housing which had been preferred prior to the war following the garden suburb model including a large proportion of cottage flats or 'four-in-a-block' housing with separate front doors (as at Balornock, Cardonald, Carntyne, Carnwadric, Croftfoot, Househillwood, Kelvindale, King's Park, Knightswood, Mosspark, Riddrie, Sandyhills) built by just a few firms, which were well-received and have largely survived to the present day, but were considered to take too long to build and use too much land in comparison with the urgent need to replace so much of the inner city.

The four main peripheral developments (Castlemilk, Drumchapel, Easterhouse and Pollok) grew to become among the largest in Europe, while other smaller but substantial neighbourhoods (Arden, Barlanark, Barmulloch, Cranhill, Eastwood, Garthamlock, Merrylee, Milton, Toryglen, South Nitshill) were also constructed, largely consisting of tenement-style housing of three or four storeys. The city's initial multi-storey residential experiments in the 1950s at Crathie Court, Moss Heights and Prospecthill were largely successful (and have survived into the 21st century) but their scale of only 10 floors did not address the availability issue sufficiently, and in the next decade the number of towers commissioned by Glasgow and the height of the structures, including ambitious projects in Dalmarnock, Hutchesontown, Kennishead, Pollokshaws, Red Road, Scotstounhill, Sighthill Woodside and Wyndford, was also one of the highest across the continent.

While the facilities in dwellings in the towers and the modern tenements were an improvement on the slum housing, the large 'schemes' lacked basic amenities and employment opportunities, and were often cheaply built using pre-fabricated concrete construction methods which were ill-suited to the intemperate climate of Western Scotland.   Damp quickly penetrated and spread within the new buildings which caused health problems; this was also the case with many of the tower blocks (or 'high flats' as they typically referred to by Glaswegians), many of which were surrounded by low-rise housing on a common design theme from idealised plans which seldom matched reality – in some cases, existing amenities in older districts had been swept away to provide space for the modern 'upgrades', which sometimes never materialised or were inadequate. Many residents struggled with the lack of provision made for child welfare and social needs such as hairdressing and clothing shops, there were also issues arising from the lack of help given to older members of the community in adjusting to the new buildings and amenities. Some first generation 'emigrees' chose to return to their old neighbourhoods to socialise whenever possible, creating a strange situation where otherwise desolate environments such as post-demolition Gorbals retained thriving public houses on isolated corners, with their clientele having stayed loyal despite moving several miles away to estates with no such establishments. The condition of the schemes and the towers was not helped by the decline of the city's traditional industries in the same period, with breadwinners finding themselves out of work and their families isolated on the edge of town or fifteen floors up (sometimes both) in a city with low levels of car ownership, contributing to an increase in antisocial behaviour like gang fighting and vandalism, and the abuse of alcohol and drugs, all of which earned many parts of Glasgow a generalised reputation as hotbeds of violence and deprivation which should be avoided, in effect new slums in place of those they had been intended to replace just a few decades earlier.

As demonstrated elsewhere in the UK, the tower blocks gradually deteriorated, attracting crime and fostering a reputation for being undesirable low cost housing.  Because many of the towers were of a standard "off the peg" design, it meant that design flaws were replicated in several areas of the city. The cost of maintaining the buildings was far higher than anticipated, and while some tower blocks were upgraded in the 1980s with apex roofs (to combat damp), secured entry and external cladding; by the 1990s demolition was becoming the preferred solution over repair and renovation. While some of the initial tenants were happy living in the towers and chose to stay, the low desirability of the accommodation meant that those who were dissatisfied and moved out were typically replaced by 'problem' tenants with little other option whose lifestyles led to the issues worsening, more original tenants left and the downward cycle continued until some of the blocks were almost empty. A major turning point in the city's policy towards such "schemes" was signalled when the decision was taken to demolish the Hutchesontown C tower blocks in 1993 – once regarded as flagship developments of their time, but now viewed as a monument to the planning mistakes of the 1950s and 1960s.

Meanwhile, the policy of tenement demolition was now considered to have been short-sighted, wasteful and largely unsuccessful. In the East End, the Glasgow Eastern Area Renewal (GEAR) scheme which began in the late 1970s demonstrated that the tenements, if sympathetically refurbished, could be turned back into viable housing of a higher quality than many of the post-war concrete estates and towers. Following the GEAR initiative, many of Glasgow's worst tenements in areas such as Govan and Springburn also were refurbished into desirable accommodation in the 1970s and 1980s and the policy of demolition is considered to have destroyed many fine examples of a "universally admired architectural style", although this traditional style survives in many districts (with variations in design and quality) including Battlefield, Cathcart, Crosshill, Cessnock, Dennistoun, East Pollokshields, Finnieston, Govanhill, Hillhead, Hyndland, Linthouse, Partick, Possilpark, Shawlands, Shettleston, Woodlands, Yoker and Yorkhill. They have outlasted the vast majority of the inter-war rehousing grade (lower quality material) blocks intended to replace them, with developments at Barrowfield, Blackhill, the Calton, Cowlairs, Hamiltonhill, Lilybank, 'Maryhill Valley', Moorepark Oatlands and Teucharhill having to be rebuilt from scratch by the 2010s (pockets of this style remain at Battlefield, Bridgeton, Craigton, Germiston, Govanhill, Haghill, Ibrox, Riddrie, Scotstoun, Shawlands, Shettleston, Springburn etc., mostly refurbished or better appointed from the outset).

The Glasgow Housing Association took ownership of the housing stock from the city council on 7 March 2003, and began a £96 million programme to clear and demolish many of the high-rise flats and refurbish others; such programmes had already been implemented in most of the peripheral schemes, with some refurbishment and some replacement of tenements with individual houses, and this work also continued under the GHA and local housing co-operatives.

Glasgow tower blocks
The map and list concentrates on towers of at least 12 storeys in height built between the late 1950s and early 1970s within Glasgow. Also includes early 10-storey developments at Moss Heights and Toryglen due to their importance in the uptake of the method, but does not include numerous similar developments outside the city boundaries nor modern residential developments (e.g. Argyle Building, Glasgow Harbour, Lancefield Quay), nor contemporary buildings with other uses (e.g. Glasgow College of Building and Printing, Elmbank Gardens, Livingstone Tower and The Pinnacle – the latter was originally a commercial property before being converted to residential use in the early 21st century).

List of developments

Key:
 = Existing development
 = Partially existing development (some blocks demolished, figures are for original completed total).
 = Demolished development
ABC(4) = Code for development name (number of towers).

Notes

See also 
 Brutalism in Sheffield 
 List of council high-rise apartment buildings in the City of Leeds
 List of tallest buildings and structures in Glasgow

References

Buildings and structures in Glasgow
Housing in Scotland
History of Glasgow
Brutalist architecture in Scotland
Glasgow-related lists